.

Giovanni Francesco Bagnoli (1678–1713) was an Italian painter of the Baroque period, who painted still-life paintings. He was born and active in Florence.

References

1678 births
1713 deaths
17th-century Italian painters
Italian male painters
18th-century Italian painters
Painters from Florence
Italian Baroque painters
Italian still life painters
18th-century Italian male artists